The citril finch (Carduelis citrinella), also known as the Alpine citril finch, is a small songbird, a member of the true finch family, Fringillidae. For a long time, this cardueline finch was placed in the genus Serinus, but it is apparently very closely related to the European goldfinch (C. carduelis).

This bird is a resident breeder in the mountains of southwestern Europe from Spain to the Alps. Its northernmost breeding area is found in the Black Forest of southwestern Germany.

Taxonomy

The citril finch was formally described by the German zoologist Peter Simon Pallas in 1764 under the binomial name Fringilla citrinella. The current genus name Carduelis is the Latin word for the European goldfinch, and the specific epithet citrinella is the Italian word for a small yellow bird. It is a diminutive of the Latin citrinus meaning citrine or light greenish-yellow. The Corsican finch (Carduelis corsicana) was at one time considered as conspecific with the citril finch, but is now treated as a separate species. Molecular genetic studies have shown that the citril finch is closely related to the European goldfinch (Carduelis carduelis).

Description and systematics

It is greyish above, with a brown tinge to the back which also has black streaks. The underparts and the double wing bars are yellow. It shares with its relatives a bright face mask which in this species is also yellow.

Sexes are similar, although young females may be duller below, and juvenile birds – unlike in the European Serinus species – are brown, lacking any yellow or green in the plumage.

The song is a silvery twittering resembling that of the European goldfinch (C. carduelis) and that of the European serin (Serinus serinus). The main call is a tee-ee, quite similar to the Eurasian siskin (Spinus spinus).

Ecology

The citril finch (Carduelis citrinella) differs from the Corsican finch (C. corsicana) in habitat selection. While the mainland citril finch is rather restricted to subalpine coniferous forests and Alpine meadows, the insular Corsican finch may be found in different habitats from sea level to the highest mountain slopes. The citril finch nests mainly in conifers such as pines (Pinus) and spruces (Picea) while the Corsican finch uses also lower bushes such as tree Heath (Erica arborea), juniper (Juniperus) and bramble (Rubus).

Ranging more widely than its equally common eastern relative, the citril finch is classified as a Species of Least Concern by the IUCN.

References

Sources
 Clement, Peter; Harris, Alan & Davis, John (1993): Finches and Sparrows: an identification guide. Christopher Helm, London. 

 
 
 Pasquet, E. & Thibault, J.-C. (1997): Genetic differences among mainland and insular forms of the Citril Finch Serinus citrinella. Ibis 139(4): 679–684.  (HTML abstract)
 Sangster, George (2000): Genetic distance as a test of species boundaries in the Citril Finch Serinus citrinella: a critique and taxonomic reinterpretation. Ibis 142(3): 487–490. 
 Sangster, George; Knox, Alan G.; Helbig, Andreas J. & Parkin, David T. (2002): Taxonomic recommendations for European birds. Ibis 144(1): 153–159.

Further reading
 
 Arnaiz-Villena A, Alvarez-Tejado M, Ruiz-del-Valle V, Garcia-de-la-Torre C, Varela P, Recio MJ, Ferre S, Martinez-Laso J. (1999): Rapid radiation of canaries (Genus Serinus). 
 Förschler, Marc Imanuel & Kalko, Elisabeth K.V. (2007): Geographical differentiation, acoustic adaptation and species boundaries in mainland citril finches and insular Corsican finches, superspecies Carduelis [citrinella]. Journal of Biogeography 34(9).  (HTML abstract)

External links

Audio recordings from Xeno-canto
 Oiseaux Photos

citril finch
Birds of Europe
citril finch
Taxa named by Peter Simon Pallas